The gracioso is a clown or jester in Spanish comedy of the 16th century. Clarín, the clown in Pedro Calderón de la Barca's Life is a dream is recognized as a gracioso.

Benjamin Ivry describes the gracioso as "scatological, sexual, anti-feminist, anti-Semitic, and a vehicle for wild, anti-heroic satire. A gross trickster with license to every obscenity, a gracioso could also be poignant, but mostly he burlesqued eroticism by declaring as identical hermaphrodites, homosexuals and eunuchs .

Northrop Frye identified him as a type of tricky slave.

Alborada del gracioso, the fourth movement of Miroirs (1904–05) by Maurice Ravel, is a musical portrait of a gracioso.

References

 

Fictional jesters